Michaela Baschin (born 2 June 1984) is a German judoka, competing in the 48 kg-category. Baschin, who is currently ranked at 3rd Dan, won Bronze Medals at the 2006 and the 2009 European Judo Championships. She competed in the 2008 Summer Olympics.

References

External links
 
 

1984 births
Living people
Olympic judoka of Germany
Judoka at the 2008 Summer Olympics
German female judoka
20th-century German women
21st-century German women